Antonina Shmeleva (born 25 July 1994) is a Russian judoka.

She is the gold medallist of the 2018 Judo Grand Prix The Hague in the -78 kg category.

References

External links
 

1994 births
Living people
Russian female judoka
21st-century Russian women